Hardcase may refer to:
 Hardcase (film),  a 1972 American Western television film
 Hardcase (novel), a 2001 novel by Dan Simmons
 Hardcase (comics)

See also
 The Hard Case, a 1995 British short film